Oliver Edmunds Glenn (October 3, 1878 – ?) was a mathematician at the University of Pennsylvania who worked on finite groups and invariant theory.

He received the degrees of A.B. in 1902 and A.M. in 1903 from Indiana University and the Ph.D. degree from the University of Pennsylvania in 1905. He married Alice Thomas Kinnard on Aug. 18, 1903, and they had two sons, William James and Robert Culbertson. Glenn began his career instructing mathematics at Indiana University in 1902 and subsequently taught at Drury College (Springfield, Mo.). He joined the faculty of the University of Pennsylvania in 1906 where he became a full professor in 1914 and retired in 1930.

He was an Invited Speaker of the ICM in 1924 at Toronto, in 1928 at Bologna, and in 1932 at Zurich.

References

External links
 
 

1878 births
20th-century American mathematicians
Indiana University alumni
University of Pennsylvania alumni
University of Pennsylvania faculty
Year of death missing
The American Mathematical Monthly editors